is a railway station on the Nagano Line in the northeastern part of the city of Nagano, Japan. It is owned and operated by the private railway operating company Nagano Electric Railway. Asahi Station is the closest railroad station to the Aqua Wing Arena which was the B-Arena for ice hockey at the 1998 Winter Olympics.

Lines
Asahi Station is a station on the Nagano Electric Railway Nagano Line. It is 6.3 kilometers from the terminus of the line at Nagano Station and 27 km from the opposite terminus at Yudanaka Station. Both the local train and Express B trains stop at Asahi Station.

Station layout
The station consists of one ground-level island platform serving two tracks, connected to the station building by a level crossing. The staffed station building itself consists of one automatic ticket machine. Station staff manually collect tickets from arriving passengers. Departing passengers do not need to show their tickets.

At the western end of the platform, the train runs on parallel tracks connected by two railroad switches. At the eastern end of the platform, the tracks merge to a single track which runs to Fuzokuchūgakumae Station and then to Yanagihara Station. From Yanagihara, the track becomes dual tracked again.

From the level crossing, there are 7 steps to the platform. There is no wheelchair-accessible slope.

The station has an open bicycle parking lot.

Platforms

Access
The Nagano City Busy, "Tohoku Gururingo" stops at Asahi Station.

Adjacent stations

History
The station opened on 28 June 1926.

CTC signaling between Asahi and Yudanaka Station was commissioned in 1980.

Passenger statistics
In fiscal 2016, the station was used by an average of 1061 passengers daily (boarding passengers only).

Surrounding area

Choumeiji
Jodoshinshuhonganji Hasaikyo Temple
Koryuyamatsuneiwa Temple
Hori Shrine
Nagano Junior High School Attached to Shinshu University 
Nagano Chuo Driving School
Fujitsu Nagano Plant
Hokto Corporation
Nagano Sports Park, which includes Nagano Athletic Stadium, and Aqua Wing Arena one of the host sites for the Ice hockey at the 1998 Winter Olympics
Nagano City Hall Asahi Branch office

Gallery

See also
 List of railway stations in Japan

References

External links
 

Railway stations in Japan opened in 1926
Railway stations in Nagano (city)
Nagano Electric Railway